The Quinisext Council (Latin: Concilium Quinisextum; Koine Greek: , Penthékti Sýnodos), i.e., the Fifth-Sixth Council, often called the Council in Trullo, Trullan Council, or the Penthekte Synod, was a church council held in 692 at Constantinople under Justinian II. It is known as the "Council in Trullo" because, like the Sixth Ecumenical Council, it was held in a domed hall in the Imperial Palace (τρούλος [troulos] meaning a cup or dome). Both the Fifth and the Sixth Ecumenical Councils had omitted to draw up disciplinary canons, and as this council was intended to complete both in this respect, it took the name of Quinisext. It was attended by 215 bishops, mostly from the Eastern Roman Empire. Basil of Gortyna in Crete belonged to the Roman patriarchate and called himself papal legate, though no evidence is extant of his right to use that title.

Decisions
Many of the council's canons were reiterations. It endorsed not only the six ecumenical councils already held (canon 1), but also the Apostolic Canons, the Synod of Laodicea, the Third Synod of Carthage, and the 39th Festal Letter of Athanasius (canon 2).

Ban on pre-Christian practices
The Council banned certain festivals and practices which were thought to have a pagan origin. Therefore, the Council gives some insight to historians about pre-Christian religious practices. As a consequence, neither cleric nor layman was allowed to observe the Pagan festivals of Bota, the Kalends or the Brumalia.

Ritual observance
Many of the council's canons were aimed at settling differences in ritual observance and clerical discipline in different parts of the Christian Church. Being held under Byzantine auspices, with an exclusively Eastern clergy, these overwhelmingly took the practice of the Church of Constantinople as orthodox.

Armenian practices
It explicitly condemned some customs of Armenian Christians – among them using wine unmixed with water for the Eucharist (canon 32), choosing children of clergy for appointment as clergy (canon 33), and eating eggs and cheese on Saturdays and Sundays of Lent (canon 56) – and decreed deposition for clergy and excommunication for laypeople who contravened the canons prohibiting these practices.

Roman practices
Likewise, it reprobated, with similar penalties, the Roman custom of not allowing married individuals to be ordained to the diaconate or priesthood unless they vowed for perpetual continence and living separately from their wives (canon 13), and fasting on Saturdays of Lent (canon 55). Nevertheless, it also prescribed continence during those times when serving at the altar (canon 13). Without contrasting with the practice of the Roman Church, it also prescribed that the celebration of the Eucharist in Lent should only happen in Saturdays, Sundays, and the feast of the Annunciation (canon 52).

Eucharist, liturgy, evangelising, baptism
Grapes, milk and honey were not to be offered at the altar. Whoever came to receive the Eucharist should receive in the hand by holding his hands in the form of a cross. The Eucharist was not allowed to be given to dead bodies. During the liturgy the psalms were to be sung in modest and dulcet tones, and the phrase 'who was crucified for us' was not to be added to the Trisagion. Prelates were to preach the gospel as propounded by the fathers. Priests received special instructions on how to deal with those who were not baptized and they were also given rubrics to follow on how to admit heretics to the faith.

Moral guidelines for clerics and laity
In addition to these, the council also condemned clerics that had improper or illicit relations with women. It condemned simony and the charging of fees for administering the Eucharist. It enjoined those in holy orders from entering public houses, engaging in usurious practices, attending horse races in the Hippodrome, wearing unsuitable clothes or celebrating the liturgy in private homes (eukterion) without the consent of their bishops. Both clergy and laity were forbidden from gambling with dice, attending theatrical performances, or consulting soothsayers. No one was allowed to own a house of prostitution, engage in abortion, arrange hair in ornate plaits or to promote pornography. It also ordered law students at the University of Constantinople to cease wearing "clothing contrary to the general custom".

Acceptance
The Quinisext Canons found their way into Byzantine canonical collections even in the iconoclast period (despite the approval given to images of Christ in Canon 82). The immediate reaction of the see of Rome was fiercely hostile, partly because two canons (13 and 55) explicitly criticized Roman practices, but more because Rome resented being expected to approve a whole sheaf of new canons only retrospectively. In 711, however, Pope Constantine appears to have accepted a compromise whereby Rome accepted the validity of the canons in the East, while being allowed to continue existent western practices where these differed. Later a letter by Pope Hadrian I (dating to 785) quoting Tarasios of Constantinople approving the canons was attributed in the West as an explicit statement of approval by Hadrian himself. Tarasios' letter was read out and affirmed during the Second Council of Nicea, which in its first canon explicitly accepts the canons of Trullo. In consequence of the preceding, Gratian (twelfth-century) cited many of the Quinisext Canons in his own great collection of canons, the Concord of Discordant Canons. Where, however, they clashed with western canons or practice, he set them aside as representing Byzantine practice but lacking universal validity. Gratian's work remained authoritative in the West until the first systematic Code of Catholic Canon Law, issued in 1917.

See also
Pentarchy
First seven Ecumenical Councils

References

Sources
 Collins, Roger. The Arab Conquest of Spain, 710–97. Oxford: Blackwell Publishing, 1989. .
 Nedungatt, George: The council of Trullo revisited: Ecumenism and the canon of the councils, dans Theological Studies, Vol.71, September  2010, pp. 651–676.
 
 
 Concilium Constantinopolitanum a. 691/2 in Trullo habitum. H. Ohme (ed.) Acta conciliorum oecumenicorum,  Series Secunda II: Concilium Universale Constantinopolitanum Tertium, Pars 4. . Berlin/Boston Oktober 2013.

External links

Archbishop Peter L’Huillier: Quinisext Ecumenical Council
Catholic Encyclopedia: Council in Trullo
Council in Trullo in the Nicene and Post-Nicene Fathers
Canons of the Council in Trullo (in Koine Greek)
Canons of the Council in Trullo (in English translation)

Ecumenical councils
7th-century church councils
Church councils in Constantinople
History of Eastern Catholicism
Medieval Christian controversies
690s in the Byzantine Empire
692
Byzantine Empire–Holy See relations